Coffee Equipment Company was a Seattle-based manufacturer of coffee equipment. The company focused on producing equipment that creates high-quality brewed coffee. It was purchased in 2008 by Starbucks.

The company's first product was the Clover 1s, a machine that produces brewed coffee one cup at a time. The machine uses a brewing method similar to that of a French press along with a vacuum system to separate the liquid from the coffee grounds.

Starbucks CEO Howard Schultz purchased the company after trying a cup brewed by a Clover machine and declaring it to be "the best cup of brewed coffee I have ever tasted".

References

External links

Starbucks
Coffee in Seattle
Coffee preparation
Coffee companies of the United States
Manufacturing companies based in Seattle
2008 mergers and acquisitions